This is a list of Samurai Deeper Kyo manga chapter summaries by volume.



Volume list

References

Lists of manga volumes and chapters